Hajji Malek may refer to:
 Hajji Malek, Sistan and Baluchestan